The Newport 17 is an American trailerable sailboat that was designed by Harry R. Sindle as a daysailer and first built in 1974.

Production
The design was built by Newport Boats in Newport, California, United States, starting in 1974, but it is now out of production.

Design
The Newport 17 is a recreational sailboat, built predominantly of fiberglass, with wood trim. It has a fractional sloop rig, a raked stem, a reverse transom, a transom-hung rudder controlled by a tiller and a retractable  centerboard. It displaces  and carries  of ballast.

The boat is normally fitted with a small  outboard motor for docking and maneuvering.

The design has sleeping accommodation for four people, with a double "V"-berth in the bow cabin and two quarter berths in the main cabin under the cockpit that are big enough for children. There is space for a head provided.

Operational history
In a 2010 review Steve Henkel wrote, "this Harry Sindle design is a daysailer with basic overnight accommodations (double berth, place for a head, and some storage space). Best features: Sindle specialized in designing lightweight race boats, so perhaps not surprisingly, this design's sailing performance in light air is good compared to her comp[etitor]s—though her speed is also helped simply by her light weight and relatively high SA/D ratio. Storage space extending under cockpit seats is large enough to serve as quarterberths for two small children. Shallow draft with board up makes trailer launching easier. Worst features: Narrow beam and light weight compared to comps help to make her relatively tender, and high 'top hamper' (ie., freeboard and cabin height) combined with her lightness could make control quirky in gusty wind conditions. Thus even though ads say she is 'an ideal boat for novices' and 'easy to handle', we think this would be true perhaps only in light air and settled weather conditions."

See also
List of sailing boat types

References

External links
Photo of a Newport 17 being launched

1970s sailboat type designs
Sailing yachts
Trailer sailers
Sailboat type designs by Harry R. Sindle]
Sailboat types built by Newport Boats